Mahmud al-Kurdi Mosque or Jamal al-Din Mahmud al-Istadar Mosque is a historic mosque in Cairo, Egypt. It was founded by an amir called Mahmud al-Kurdi who was the ustadar or majordomo of the Mamluk Sultan Barquq. It is located just south of the Qasaba of Radwan Bey (or Tentmakers' Street) which branches out from the Ahmad Maher Street, in Historic Cairo, in the district of al-Darb al-Ahmar.

History 
The mosque was completed in 1395.

Restoration work by the Ministry of Antiquity begun in 1979 and was completed in 2004. Subsequently, the minaret was plastered in white.

Architecture
This small mosque has a few notable characteristics. The dome is among the earliest stone domes to be carved with a horizontal chevron pattern. This style replaced the pre-14th century brick and plaster ribbing on such domes. The dome is sitting on the drum with eight windows. The minaret is also notable for its round form which is unusual for this period, and was heavily used later on the Ottoman architecture. Each of the facade, window frame and the door has original inscriptions and decorations. The metal doors to the mosque are themselves of excellent craftsmanship, featuring geometric star patterns and arabesque carvings across the surface. The interior has two iwans and is notable for its resemblance to a qa'a (reception hall in domestic or palace architecture), which possibly indicates that the mosque was converted from a house.

Gallery

See also
  Lists of mosques 
  List of mosques in Africa
  List of mosques in Egypt
 History of medieval Arabic and Western European domes

References

14th-century mosques
Medieval Cairo
Mosques in Cairo
Mosque buildings with domes
Mamluk architecture in Egypt